Lhotse Shar is a glacier of the Himalayas in the Solukhumbu District of Nepal. It adjoins Imja Glacier to the northeast and with Ambulapcha Glacier forms three major glaciers.  To the east is Cho Polu (6734m/22,093ft).

References

Glaciers of Nepal
Solukhumbu District